Namazi is an Iranian surname. Notable people with the surname include:

 Hossein Namazi, Iranian economist and politician
 Mohammad Namazi, Iranian businessman
 Omid Namazi, Iranian-American soccer defender
 Siamak Namazi, Iranian-American businessman imprisoned in Iran since 2015

See also
 Namazi Hospital
 Namazi Square
 Namazi Metro Station

Iranian-language surnames